Finklea is an unincorporated community and census-designated place (CDP) in Horry County, South Carolina, United States. As of the 2020 census it had a population of 291.

The CDP is in northern Horry County, at the intersection of South Carolina Highways 410, 917 and 9 Business. Highway 410 leads south  to U.S. Route 701 at Baxter Forks and northeast  to Tabor City, North Carolina, and Highway 917 leads northwest  to Mullins. The Highway 9 business loop leads north with Highway 410  to Highway 9 at Green Sea and southeast  to Loris.

Demographics

2020 census

Note: the US Census treats Hispanic/Latino as an ethnic category. This table excludes Latinos from the racial categories and assigns them to a separate category. Hispanics/Latinos can be of any race.

References 

Census-designated places in Horry County, South Carolina
Census-designated places in South Carolina